Players and pairs who neither have high enough rankings nor receive wild cards may participate in a qualifying tournament held one week before the annual Wimbledon Tennis Championships.

Seeds

  Eva Martincová /  Tatiana Perebiynis (qualified)
  Maja Matevžič /  Dragana Zarić (qualified)
  Eleni Daniilidou /  Caroline Schneider (qualifying competition)
  Li Na /  Petra Rampre (first round)
  Amanda Augustus /  Jennifer Embry (qualified)
  Haruka Inoue /  Maja Palaveršić (qualifying competition)
  Anastasia Myskina /  Alexandra Stevenson (first round)
  Zsófia Gubacsi /  Vanessa Henke (qualifying competition)

Qualifiers

  Eva Martincová /  Tatiana Perebiynis
  Maja Matevžič /  Dragana Zarić
  Amanda Augustus /  Jennifer Embry
  Dawn Buth /  Natalie Grandin

Qualifying draw

First qualifier

Second qualifier

Third qualifier

Fourth qualifier

External links

2001 Wimbledon Championships on WTAtennis.com
2001 Wimbledon Championships – Women's draws and results at the International Tennis Federation

Women's Doubles Qualifying
Wimbledon Championship by year – Women's doubles qualifying
Wimbledon Championships